The women's 200 metres at the 2004 Summer Olympics as part of the athletics program were held at the Athens Olympic Stadium from August 24 to 26.

The top four runners in each of the initial seven heats automatically qualified for the second round. The next four fastest runners from across the heats also qualified. Those 32 runners competed in four heats in the second round, with the top three from each heat and the four next fastest overall advancing to the semifinals. In two semifinal heats, only the top four runners from each heat moved on to the final.

Leading up to the Olympic final, Jamaica's Veronica Campbell was considered a pre-race favorite of this event, as she had previously managed to beat her own world leading time in the semifinals. She was also expected to challenge the youngster Allyson Felix, who had quickly become the top medal contender for the Americans. From the blocks, Campbell took a commanding lead with a strong curve and kept her form in the last few strides of the track to hold off a charge from Felix for the Olympic title at 22.05 seconds. Felix closed the race quickly to get the silver medal and set the world junior record. On the outside, Bahamian sprinter Debbie Ferguson was immediately chased by Campbell's teammate Aleen Bailey, but the places were clearly decided.

Records
, the existing World and Olympic records were as follows.

No new records were set during the competition.

Qualification
The qualification period for athletics took place from 1 January 2003 to 9 August 2004. For the women's 200 metres, each National Olympic Committee was permitted to enter up to three athletes that had run the race in 22.97 seconds or faster during the qualification period. If an NOC had no athletes that qualified under that standard, one athlete that had run the race in 23.12 seconds or faster could be entered.

Schedule
All times are Eastern European Summer Time (UTC+3)

Results

Round 1
Qualification rule: The first four finishers in each heat (Q) plus the next four fastest overall runners (q) qualified.

Heat 1
Wind: +0.4 m/s

Heat 2
Wind: +1.7 m/s

Heat 3
Wind: +1.6 m/s

Heat 4
Wind: +2.0 m/s

Heat 5
Wind: +2.1 m/s

Heat 6
Wind: −0.2 m/s

Heat 7
Wind: +1.4 m/s

Round 2
Qualification rule: The first three finishers in each heat (Q) plus the next four fastest overall runners (q) advanced to the semifinals.

Heat 1
Wind: +0.4 m/s

Heat 2
Wind: +0.4 m/s

Heat 3
Wind: +0.2 m/s

Heat 4
Wind: −0.1 m/s

Semifinals
Qualification rule: The first four finishers in each heat (Q) moved on to the final.

Semifinal 1
Wind: +0.5 m/s

Semifinal 2
Wind: +1.1 m/s

Final
Wind: +0.8 m/s

References

External links
 IAAF Athens 2004 Olympic Coverage

W
200 metres at the Olympics
2004 in women's athletics
Women's events at the 2004 Summer Olympics